Feminism in Bangladesh seeks equal rights of women in Bangladesh through social and political change. Article 28 of Bangladesh constitution states that "Women shall have equal rights with men in all spheres of the State and of public life".

History 
Feminist movements in Bangladesh started long before its independence. During the 19th century the social reform movement, mostly carried out by male social leaders, worked to abolish practices such as infanticide, child marriage, and widow burning. Women activists in Bangladesh organized to claim their rights during the British and Pakistan period of Bangladesh. They mobilized to fight regarding issues including violence against women, economic opportunities for women, equal representation in politics for women, reproductive rights, reforming family law, and gender equality in public policies. During the Pakistan period the feminist movement was more focused on politics and national struggles. The feminist movement of the 1970s and 1980s was led by professional women from urban areas.

Issues

Muslim Family Law
The Muslim Family Law was enacted by the British Indian government. Which is discriminatory against women's rights law.

Bangladeshi feminists  
Begum Rokeya was a notable Muslim feminist, educator, and activist.
Kamini Roy was the first woman honors graduate in British India.
Nawab Faizunnesa was the first woman Nawab of South Asia, she is known for her campaign for female education and other social issues related to women
Mohammad Nasiruddin, Bangladeshi journalist, women's rights activist, and publisher of Begum
Fazilatunnesa, Bangladeshi mathematician, Principal of Eden Mohila College, and first female post-graduate of Muslim Bengal.
Nurjahan Begum, pioneer female journalist and editor of  Begum, the first women's magazine in Bangladesh.
Nurun Nahar Faizannesa was a leader of the feminist movement in Bangladesh-
Mahmuda Khatun Siddiqua, Bangladeshi poet, essayist, and a pioneering women's liberation activist.
Sultana Kamal is a Bangladeshi lawyer and human rights activist. She serves as the Executive Director of Ain o Salish Kendra, a civil rights organization.
Sufia Kamal, Bangladeshi poet, feminist leader, and social activist.
Taslima Nasrin is a feminist who is known for her criticism of religion.
Syeda Razia Faiz was the first female elected member of parliament in Bangladesh.
Hasna Begum is a contemporary Bangladeshi philosopher of feminism and held the prestigious Rokeya Chair by the University Grants Commission (UGC).
Rokeya Rahman Kabeer was a woman emancipation activist.
Masuda Khatun was a pioneering feminist who was given the nickname Agni Nagini (Fire Serpent) by Kazi Nazrul Islam.
Wasfia Nazreen is the first Bangladeshi, and Bengali person of any gender, to climb all the Seven Summits.
 Shaheda Mustafiz is the first female programmer of Bangladesh.
 Ayesha Khanam, Bangladeshi feminist leader and freedom fighter.
 Rounaq Jahan, Bangladeshi political scientist, feminist leader, and author.
 Angela Gomes, social worker and founder of Banchte Shekha (Learn How To Survive)
 Husne Ara Kamal, Bangladeshi academician and social worker.
 Shireen Huque, cofounder of Naripokkho and anti-violence crusader.
 Rahnuma Ahmed, anthropologist, activist, and author
 Nazma Akter, Bangladeshi trade unionist and founder of the Awaj Foundation.
 Joya Sikder, transgender activist and founder of Somporker Noya Setu (SNS)
 Tasaffy Hossain, founder of the feminist organization Bonhishikha, that first staged The Vagina Monologues in Bangladesh.
 Trishia Nashtaran, founder of the feminist grassroots organization Meye Network.

Organizations 
 Begum Magazine, founded in 1947
 Bangladesh Mahila Samiti (formerly Dhaka branch of All Pakistan Women's Association), opened in 1949
 Dhaka Ladies Club, opened in 1951
 Bangladesh Mahila Parishad, formed in 1970
 Banchte Shekha, established in 1976
 Naripokkho, formed in 1973
 Bangladesh National Woman Lawyers' Association, formed in 1979.
 Hill Women's Federation(HWF)formed in 1988
 Acid Survivors Foundation, founded in 1999
 Awaj Foundation, founded in 2003
 Bonhishikha, formed in 2010.
 Somporker Noya Setu (SNS), formed in 2010
 Mondro, formed in 2019

See also
 Women in Bangladesh
 Islamic feminism
 Women in Hinduism
 Women in Islam
 Feminist theology

References

 
Bangladeshi culture
Bangladesh